Maurice Gransart (8 July 1930 – 27 April 2013) was a French professional footballer who played for Marseille, as a defender. His son was Roland Gransart.

References

1930 births
2013 deaths
French footballers
Olympique de Marseille players
Association football defenders